Dream State are a Welsh rock band from South Wales formed in 2014. They signed to Australian record label UNFD in 2017 and have released two EPs (their debut Consequences in 2015 and Recovery in 2018) as well as a studio album Primrose Path.

The band currently consists of guitarist Aled Evans, along with bassist Jake Bowen, drummer Tom Connolly and vocalist Jessie Powell.

History

Formation and Consequences 
Dream State was formed in South Wales, UK, in 2014 by vocalist CJ Gilpin, guitarists Aled Evans and Sam Harrison-Little, bassist Danny Rayer and drummer Jamie Lee.

They released their first single, "Burn Them Down", on 8 January 2015. Later that year, on 20 November, they released their first EP Consequences, which was recorded at The Boneyard Studio in South Wales.

Line-up change, UNFD and Recovery 
In March 2017 the band released their single "White Lies". That summer they had their first festival appearance at Reading and Leeds Festivals. It was later announced, that Dream State had signed to independent record label UNFD at the festival.

2017 also saw a change in line-up. Sam Harrison-Little left the band to spend more time with his family and was replaced by Rhys Wilcox.

On 18 May 2018, the band's second EP Recovery was released through UNFD.

Dream State is featured on the 2018 compilation album Songs That Saved My Life in aid of mental health and suicide prevention charities. For the compilation, the band recorded a cover of Linkin Park's "Crawling".

Primrose Path and departure of Danny Rayer 
On 6 March 2019, Dream State released the single "Hand in Hand".

The band released their single "Primrose" on 10 July 2019. It is their first release after the departure of bassist Danny Rayer, who "has decided to focus his time on his wonderful family."

On 20 August 2019, the band released their single "Open Windows" and also announced that their debut album Primrose Path, produced by Dan Weller, would  be released on 18 October 2019.

Dream State released their single "Twenty Letters" on 8 October 2019, a day after its premiere on Annie Mac's Radio 1's Future Sounds on BBC Radio 1.

On 18 October 2019 their debut album Primrose Path was released and opened on position 100 in the official UK Albums Chart. Loudwire named it one of the 50 best rock albums of 2019. Following the release, the band went on a UK headliner tour beginning on 27 October 2019 in Glasgow and went on to support Being as an Ocean on their tour through Europe afterwards. In the beginning of 2020, Dream State supported I Prevail on their Europe tour. The final leg of the tour had to be postponed due to the COVID-19 pandemic.

Dream State released their music video for "Are You Ready To Live?" on 24 June 2020. The video features clips sent in by fans as well as live footage of the band.

On 28 October 2020 the band released their single "Monsters". Two days later, Dream State announced the amicable departure of drummer Jamie Lee.

Departure of CJ and Rhys, new lineup 
On 24 February 2022 a statement from guitarist Aled Evans was posted on the bands social media, announcing that CJ Gilpin and Rhys Wilcox have left the band. It was also revealed that the band had brought in a new drummer and a new bassist, which was unnamed during that time. The new lineup has been unveiled on 14 October 2022 through their social media accounts, bassist Jake Bowen, drummer Tom Connolly and vocalist Jessie Powell were introduced as the new members. Along with the new lineup, the band released a new song and music video for "Taunt Me".

Musical style and influences 
Dream State's musical style has mostly been described as post-hardcore and alternative rock. Jake Richardson of Kerrang! wrote about the band's sound: "It can loosely be described as post-hardcore, but the quintet throw in elements of math-rock, metal and punk and impress at every point."

Slipknot, Tool and Linkin Park have been cited as some of the band's influences.

Members 
Current
 Jessie Powell – lead vocals (2022–present)
 Aled Evans – lead guitar (2014–present), rhythm guitar, backing vocals (2022-present)
 Jake Bowen – bass guitar, backing vocals (2021–present)
 Tom Connolly – drums (2021–present)

Former
 Sam Harrison-Little – rhythm guitar, backing vocals (2014–2017)
 Danny Rayer – bass guitar (2014–2019)
 Jamie Lee – drums (2014–2020)
 Charlotte-Jayne "CJ" Gilpin – lead vocals (2014–2021)
 Rhys Wilcox – rhythm guitar, backing vocals (2017–2021)

Timeline

Discography

Studio albums

Extended plays

Compilation appearances 
 Songs That Saved My Life (2018) – "Crawling" (originally performed by Linkin Park)

Music videos

Awards 
Kerrang! Awards
|-
| 2018 || Dream State|| | Best British Breakthrough || 
|}
Heavy Music Awards
|-
| 2019 || Dream State|| | Best UK Breakthrough Band || 
|}

References

External links 
 Official website

British post-hardcore musical groups
Kerrang! Awards winners
Musical groups established in 2014
Musical quintets
Welsh alternative rock groups
2014 establishments in Wales